Samih Abdel Fattah Iskandar served as International Commissioner of the Jordanian Association for Boy Scouts and Girl Guides, as well as the Chairman of the Arab Scout Committee.

In 1995, he was awarded the 240th Bronze Wolf, the only distinction of the World Organization of the Scout Movement, awarded by the World Scout Committee for exceptional services to world Scouting.

References

External links

Recipients of the Bronze Wolf Award
Year of birth missing
Scouting and Guiding in Jordan